Speed is a 1994 American action film directed by Jan de Bont in his feature film directorial debut. The film stars Keanu Reeves, Dennis Hopper, Sandra Bullock, Joe Morton, and Jeff Daniels. Its premise revolves around a bus that is rigged by a terrorist to explode if its speed falls below 50 miles per hour.

The film premiered in Hollywood on June 7, 1994, and was released in the rest of the United States on June 10, 1994, it became critically and commercially successful, grossing $350.4 million on a $30–37 million budget, becoming the fifth-highest-grossing film of 1994 and winning two Academy Awards: Best Sound Effects Editing and Best Sound. A sequel, Speed 2: Cruise Control, was released on June 13, 1997, without Reeves' involvement. David Edelstein considered it to be the worst sequel of all time.

Plot

LAPD SWAT bomb disposal officers Jack Traven and Harry Temple thwart an attempt to hold an elevator full of people for a $3 million ransom by an extortionist bomber, later identified as Howard Payne. As they corner Payne, he takes Harry hostage. Jack intentionally shoots Harry in the leg, forcing the bomber to release him. Payne flees and detonates the bomb, seemingly dying. Jack and Harry are praised by Lieutenant "Mac" McMahon, with Harry being promoted. Having survived the incident, however, Payne watches from afar. The next morning, Jack witnesses a mass transit bus explode from a bomb planted by Payne, who contacts Jack on a nearby payphone, explaining that a similar bomb is rigged on another bus, which will activate once it reaches  and detonate if it drops below 50. 

Payne also demands a ransom of $3.7 million and threatens to detonate the bus if the passengers are offloaded. Jack races through freeway traffic and boards the bus, but the bomb is already armed. He explains the situation to Sam Silver, the bus driver. However, a felon on board, fearing Jack is about to arrest him, wildly discharges his gun, accidentally wounding Sam. Another passenger, Annie Porter, takes over for Sam, but when she tries to slow down so he can get help, Jack is forced to reveal the bomb, to the passengers' shock and horror. Jack examines the bomb underneath the bus and calls Harry, who works to identify the bomber. The bus is cleared to drive on an unopened freeway section. Mac demands that they offload the passengers onto a flatbed trailer, but Jack warns him about Payne's plot. 

Witnessing the events on TV, Payne calls Jack to reiterate his instructions. While he is convinced to allow the injured Sam to be offloaded for medical attention as a show of good will, Payne detonates a smaller bomb after witnessing a passenger attempt to get off, killing her. When Jack learns part of the freeway is incomplete, he persuades Annie to accelerate so they can jump the gap, which narrowly succeeds, before directing her to Los Angeles International Airport to use their unobstructed runways. Meanwhile, Harry identifies Payne's name, former occupation as an Atlanta PD bomb squad officer, and address. He leads a SWAT team to Payne's home, but the property explodes, killing him and most of his team. In a last-ditch attempt to defuse the bomb, Jack goes under the bus on a towed sled, but he accidentally punctures the fuel tank when the sled breaks from its tow line. 

After the passengers bring him back aboard, Jack learns that Harry has been killed and that Payne has been watching the passengers on a hidden surveillance camera. Mac has a local news crew record the transmission and rebroadcasts it on a loop to fool Payne while the passengers are offloaded onto an airport bus. Jack and Annie escape through a floor access panel before the empty bus collides with a Boeing 707 cargo plane and explodes. Jack and Mac head to Pershing Square to drop the ransom. Realizing that he has been fooled, no one died in the explosion, and the LAPD are waiting for him, a furious Payne poses as a police officer to kidnap Annie and recover the ransom. Jack follows Payne into the Metro Red Line subway, and discovers that Annie has been fitted with an explosive vest rigged to a pressure-release detonator. 

Payne hijacks a subway train, handcuffs Annie to a pole, and sets the train in motion while Jack pursues them. After killing the train driver, Payne attempts a bribe with the ransom money, but is enraged when a dye pack in the bag explodes, tainting the cash. A crazed Payne battles Jack on the train's roof and gains the upper hand, standing on top of Jack and trying to strangle him. However, Jack pushes Payne's head up, and he is decapitated by an oncoming railway signal. 

Jack deactivates Annie's vest, but cannot free her from the pole as Payne had the key to her handcuffs. Unable to stop the train, Jack accelerates it, causing it to jump the tracks, as it plows through a construction site and then bursts onto Hollywood Boulevard. The train car comes to a halt, on the street. Unharmed, Jack and Annie share a kiss while a crowd looks on in amazement.

Cast

Production

Writing
Screenwriter Graham Yost was told by his father, Canadian television host Elwy Yost, about a 1985 film called Runaway Train starring Jon Voight, about a train that speeds out of control. The film was based on a 1963 concept by Japanese filmmaker Akira Kurosawa. Elwy mistakenly believed that the train's situation was due to a bomb on board. (Such a theme had in fact been used in a 1975 Japanese film, The Bullet Train.) After seeing the Voight film, Graham decided that it would have been better if there had been a bomb on board a bus with the bus being forced to travel at 20 mph to prevent an actual explosion. A friend suggested that this be increased to 50 mph. The film's end was inspired by the end of the 1976 film Silver Streak. Yost had initially named the film Minimum Speed reflecting on the plot element of the bus unable to drop below a speed. He realized that using "minimum" would immediately apply a negative connotation to the title, and simply renamed it to Speed.

Yost's initial script would have the film completely occur on the bus; there was no elevator or subway scene, the bus would have driven around Dodger Stadium due to the ability to drive around in circles, and would have culminated with the bus running into the Hollywood Sign and destroying it. Upon finishing the script, Yost took his idea to Paramount Pictures, which expressed interest in green-lighting the film and chose John McTiernan to direct due to his blockbuster films Predator, Die Hard, and The Hunt for Red October. However, McTiernan eventually declined to do so, feeling the script was too much of a Die Hard retread, and suggested Jan De Bont, who agreed to direct because he had the experience of being the director of photography for action movies, including McTiernan's Die Hard and The Hunt for Red October. Michael Bay wanted to direct the film. Despite a promising script, Paramount passed on the project, feeling audiences would not want to see a movie which takes place for two hours on a bus, so De Bont and Yost then took the project to 20th Century Fox which also distributed Die Hard.  Fox agreed to green-light the project on the condition there were action sequences in the film other than the bus.  De Bont then suggested starting the film off with the bomb on an elevator in an office building, as he had an experience of being trapped in an elevator while working on Die Hard. Yost used the opening elevator scene to establish Traven as being clever enough to overcome the villain, comparable to Perseus tricking Medusa into looking at her own reflection. Yost then decided to conclude the film on a subway train to have a final plot twist not involving the action on the bus. Fox then immediately approved the project.

In preparing the shooting script, one unnamed author had revised Yost's script in a manner that Yost had called "terrible". Yost spent three days "reconfiguring" this draft. Paul Attanasio was also brought in as a script doctor. Jan de Bont brought in Joss Whedon a week before principal photography started to work on the script. According to Yost: "Joss Whedon wrote 98.9 percent of the dialogue. We were very much in sync, it's just that I didn't write the dialogue as well as he did." One of Whedon's contributions was reworking Traven's character once Keanu Reeves was cast.  Reeves did not like how the Jack Traven character came across in Yost's original screenplay. He felt that there were "situations set up for one-liners and I felt it was forced—Die Hard mixed with some kind of screwball comedy." With Reeves' input, Whedon changed Traven from being "a maverick hotshot" to "the polite guy trying not to get anybody killed," and removed the character's glib dialogue and made him more earnest.

Yost also gave Whedon credit for the "Pop quiz, hotshot" line. Another of Whedon's contributions was changing the character of Doug Stephens (Alan Ruck) from a lawyer ("a bad guy and he died", according to the writer) to a tourist, "just a nice, totally out-of-his-depth guy". Whedon worked predominantly on the dialogue, but also created a few significant plot points, like the killing of Harry Temple. Yost had originally planned for Temple to be the villain of the story, as he felt that having an off-screen antagonist would not be interesting. However, Yost recognized that there was a lot of work in the script to establish Temple as this villain. When Dennis Hopper was cast as Howard Payne, Yost recognized that Hopper's Payne readily worked as a villain, allowing them to rewrite Temple to be non-complicit in the bomb situation.

Casting
Jeff Speakman was originally attached to star in Speed when the project was under Paramount's management, but was dropped from the project when it was sold to 20th Century Fox. Stephen Baldwin, the first choice for the role of Jack Traven, declined the offer because he felt the character (as written in the earlier version of the script) was too much like the John McClane character from Die Hard. According to Yost, they had also considered Tom Cruise, Tom Hanks, Wesley Snipes, and Woody Harrelson. Director Jan de Bont ultimately cast Keanu Reeves as Jack Traven after seeing him in Point Break. He felt that the actor was "vulnerable on the screen. He's not threatening to men because he's not that bulky, and he looks great to women".  Reeves had dealt with the Los Angeles Police Department (LAPD) before on Point Break, and said he noted their strong concern for human life, which he incorporated into Traven. The director did not want Traven to have long hair and wanted the character "to look strong and in control of himself". To that end, Reeves shaved his head almost completely. The director remembers, "everyone at the studio was scared shitless when they first saw it. There was only like a millimeter. What you see in the movie is actually grown in". Reeves also spent two months at Gold's Gym in Los Angeles to get in shape for the role.

For the character of Annie, Yost said that they initially wrote the character as African American and as a paramedic as to justify how she would be able to handle driving a speeding bus through traffic. The role was offered to Halle Berry but she declined the part. Berry would later regret the decision. Later, the character had then been changed to a driver's education teacher, and made the character more of a comic-relief sidekick to Jack, with Ellen DeGeneres in mind for the part. Instead, Annie became both Jack's sidekick and later love interest, leading to the casting of Sandra Bullock. Sandra Bullock came to read for Speed with Reeves to make sure there was the right chemistry between the two actors. She recalls that they had to do "all these really physical scenes together, rolling around on the floor and stuff." Meryl Streep and Kim Basinger were also offered the role of Annie but both declined. Anne Heche was offered the opportunity to consider the role.

Filming
Principal photography began on September 7, 1993, and completed on December 23, 1993, in Los Angeles. De Bont used an 80-foot model of a 50-story elevator shaft for the opening sequence. While Speed was in production, actor and Reeves's close friend River Phoenix died. Immediately after Phoenix died, de Bont changed the shooting schedule to work around Reeves and decided to give him scenes that were easier to do. "It got to him emotionally. He became very quiet, and it took him quite a while to work it out by himself and calm down. It scared the hell out of him", de Bont recalls. Initially, Reeves was nervous about the film's many action sequences but as the shooting progressed, he became more involved. He wanted to do the stunt in which Traven jumps from a Jaguar onto the bus himself, and rehearsed it in secret after de Bont disapproved. On the day of the sequence, Reeves did the stunt himself, terrifying de Bont in the process.

Eleven GM New Look buses (TDH-5303) and three Grumman 870 buses were used in the film's production. Two of them were blown up, one was used for the high-speed scenes, one had the front cut off for inside shots, and one was used solely for the "under bus" shots. Another bus was used for the bus jump scene, which was done in one take. The buses were painted in livery and colors approximating those of the Big Blue Bus serving Santa Monica, although the transit agency (Santa Monica Intercity Lines) and route (33 Downtown) were fictionalized for the film.

Many of the film's freeway scenes were filmed on California's Interstate 105 and Interstate 110 at the stack interchange known today as the Judge Harry Pregerson Interchange, which was not officially open at the time of filming. While scouting this location, De Bont noticed big sections of road missing and told screenwriter Graham Yost to add the bus jump over the unfinished freeway to the script. In the scene in which the bus must jump across a gap in an uncompleted elevated freeway-to-freeway ramp while still under construction, a ramp was used to give the bus the necessary lift off so that it could jump the full fifty feet. The bus used in the jump was empty except for the driver, who wore a shock-absorbing harness that suspended him mid-air above the seat, so he could handle the jolt on landing, and avoid spinal injury (as was the case for many stuntmen in previous years that were handling similar stunts). The highway section the bus jumped over is the directional ramp from I-105 WB to I-110 NB (not the HOV ramp from I-110 SB to I-105 WB as commonly believed), and as the flyover was already constructed, a gap was added in the editing process using computer-generated imagery with the help of Sony Pictures Imageworks. A 2009 episode of MythBusters attempted to recreate the bus jump as proposed, including the various tricks that they knew were used by the filmmakers such as the ramp, and proved that the jump, as in the film, would never have been possible.

On a commentary track on the region 1 DVD, De Bont reports that the bus jump stunt did not go as planned. To do the jump, the bus had everything possible removed to make it lighter. On the first try the stunt driver missed the ramp and crashed the bus, making it unusable. This was not reported to the studio at the time. A second bus was prepared and two days later a second attempt was successful. But, again, things did not go as intended. Advised that the bus would only go about 20 feet, the director placed one of his multiple cameras in a position that was supposed to capture the bus landing. However, the bus traveled much farther airborne than anyone had thought possible. It crashed down on top of the camera and destroyed it. Luckily, another camera placed about 90 feet from the jump ramp recorded the event.

Filming of the final scenes occurred at Mojave Airport, which doubled for Los Angeles International Airport. The shots of the LACMTA Metro Red Line through the construction zone were shot using an 1/8 scale model of the Metro Red Line, except for the jump when it derailed.

The MD520N helicopter used throughout the film, registration N599DB, Serial LN024, was sold to the Calgary Police Service in 1995, where it was in use until 2006; it was then sold to a private owner.

Reception

Box office
Speed was released on June 10, 1994, in 2,138 theaters in the United States and Canada and debuted at the number one position, grossing $14.5 million on its opening weekend. It set opening records for Fox in Brazil with a gross of $669,725 and in South Africa with a gross of $267,140. The film stayed in the number 1 spot before being taken by Wolf. When The Lion King debuted on its third weekend, Speed continued to remain in second place. It spent eight consecutive weeks at number one in Australia and ten in Japan. It grossed $121.3 million in the United States and Canada and $229.2 million internationally for a worldwide total of $350.5 million, well above its $30–37 million production budget.

Critical response
Speed received rave reviews from critics. On review aggregator website Rotten Tomatoes, the film holds an approval rating of 94% based on 72 reviews, with an average rating of 8.10/10. The site's critics consensus reads: "A terrific popcorn thriller, Speed is taut, tense, and energetic, with outstanding performances from Keanu Reeves, Dennis Hopper, and Sandra Bullock." On Metacritic the film has a weighted average score of 78 out of 100, based on 17 critics, indicating "generally favorable reviews." Audiences polled by CinemaScore gave the film an average grade of "A" on an A+ to F scale.

Roger Ebert of The Chicago Sun-Times gave the film four out of four stars and wrote, "Films like Speed belong to the genre I call Bruised Forearm Movies, because you're always grabbing the arm of the person sitting next to you. Done wrong, they seem like tired replays of old chase cliches. Done well, they're fun. Done as well as Speed, they generate a kind of manic exhilaration". Ebert also praised Hopper as "certainly the creepiest villain in the movies right now" and lauded Reeves's transition into a believable action star, after his earlier roles as "dreamy, sensitive characters". In his review for Rolling Stone magazine, Peter Travers wrote, "Action flicks are usually written off as a debased genre, unless, of course, they work. And Speed works like a charm. It's a reminder of how much movie escapism can still stir us when it's dished out with this kind of dazzle". In her review for The New York Times, Janet Maslin wrote, "Mr. Hopper finds nice new ways to convey crazy menace with each new role. Certainly, he's the most colorful figure in a film that wastes no time on character development or personality". Entertainment Weekly gave the film an "A" rating and Owen Gleiberman wrote, "It's a pleasure to be in the hands of an action filmmaker who respects the audience. De Bont's craftsmanship is so supple that even the triple ending feels justified, like the cataclysmic final stage of a Sega death match". Time magazine's Richard Schickel wrote, "The movie has two virtues essential to good pop thrillers. First, it plugs uncomplicatedly into lurking anxieties—in this case the ones we brush aside when we daily surrender ourselves to mass transit in a world where the loonies are everywhere". Filmmaker Quentin Tarantino named the film one of the twenty best films he had seen from 1992 to 2009.

Entertainment Weekly magazine's Owen Gleiberman ranked Speed as 1994's eighth best film. The magazine also ranked the film eighth on their "The Best Rock-'em, Sock-'em Movies of the Past 25 Years" list. Speed also ranks 451 on Empire magazine's 2008 list of "The 500 Greatest Movies of All Time".

Mark Kermode of the BBC recalled having named Speed his film of the month working at Radio 1 at the time of release, and stated in 2017, having re-watched the film for the first time in many years, that it had stood the test of time and was a masterpiece.

Home media
 On November 8, 1994, Fox Video released Speed on VHS and LaserDisc formats for the first time. Rental and video sales did very well and helped the film's domestic gross. The original VHS cassette was only available in standard 4:3 TV format at the time and on August 20, 1996, Fox Video re-released a VHS version of the film in widescreen alongside True Lies, The Abyss and The Last of the Mohicans, allowing the viewer to see the film in a similar format to its theatrical release.
 On November 3, 1998, 20th Century Fox Home Entertainment released Speed on DVD for the first time. The DVD contains the film in widescreen format but only has the film's theatrical trailer.
 A special collector's edition DVD was released on July 30, 2002, as part of Fox Home Entertainment's "Five-Star Collection" series. This THX certified DVD release included two commentaries (one with director Jan De Bont and another with writer Graham Yost and producer Mark Gordon), a DTS 5.1 audio track and various behind-the-scenes featurettes. Other special features included trailers, deleted scenes, galleries and a music video. This edition was re-released as part of Fox Home's "Award Series" on February 7, 2006. 
 A Blu-ray Disc edition was released on November 14, 2006, being part of the first wave releases on the format from 20th Century Fox. This edition includes the two commentaries from the special collector's edition, a trivia track, the theatrical trailer and an interactive game.
 20th Century Studios and Walt Disney Studios Home Entertainment released the film on Ultra HD Blu-ray on May 4, 2021. This edition retains the commentaries and most of the special features from the 2002 special collector's edition.

Accolades

Year-end lists

 7th – Mack Bates, The Milwaukee Journal
 7th – John Hurley, Staten Island Advance
 9th – David Stupich, The Milwaukee Journal
 9th – Joan Vadeboncoeur, Syracuse Herald American
 9th – Michael Mills, The Palm Beach Post
 9th – Dan Craft, The Pantagraph
 9th – Christopher Sheid, The Munster Times
 10th – Bob Strauss, Los Angeles Daily News
 10th – Robert Denerstein, Rocky Mountain News
 Top 10 (listed alphabetically, not ranked) – Matt Zoller Seitz, Dallas Observer
 Top 10 (listed alphabetically, not ranked) – William Arnold, Seattle Post-Intelligencer
 Top 10 (listed alphabetically, not ranked) – Eleanor Ringel, The Atlanta Journal-Constitution
 Top 10 (listed alphabetically, not ranked) – Steve Murray, The Atlanta Journal-Constitution
 Top 10 (listed alphabetically, not ranked) – Jeff Simon, The Buffalo News
 Top 10 (not ranked) – Bob Carlton, The Birmingham News
 Best "sleepers" (not ranked) – Dennis King, Tulsa World
 "The second 10" (not ranked) – Sean P. Means, The Salt Lake Tribune
 Top 3 Runner-ups (not ranked) – Sandi Davis, The Oklahoman
 Honorable mention – Mike Clark, USA Today
 Honorable mention – Betsy Pickle, Knoxville News-Sentinel
 Honorable mention – Duane Dudek, Milwaukee Sentinel
 Honorable mention ("until the subway") – David Elliott, The San Diego Union-Tribune
 Dishonorable mention – Glenn Lovell, San Jose Mercury News

Awards

American Film Institute recognition:
 100 Years...100 Thrills: No. 99
 100 Years...100 Heroes and Villains: Jack Traven & Annie Porter - Nominated Heroes

Music

Soundtrack
A soundtrack album featuring "songs from and inspired by" the film was released on June 28, 1994, with the following tracks. The soundtrack was commercially successful in Japan, being certified gold by the RIAJ in 2002.

Score
In addition to the soundtrack release, a separate album featuring 40 minutes of Mark Mancina's score from the film was released on August 30, 1994 by 20th Century Fox Film Scores.  The CD track order does not follow the chronological order of the film's events.

La-La Land Records and Fox Music released a limited expanded version of Mark Mancina's score on February 28, 2012. The newly remastered release features 69:25 of music spread over 32 tracks (in chronological order). In addition, it includes the song "Speed" by Billy Idol.

Sequel

In 1997, a sequel, Speed 2: Cruise Control, was released. Sandra Bullock agreed to star again as Annie, for financial backing for another project, but Keanu Reeves declined the offer to return as Jack. As a result, Jason Patric was written into the story as Alex Shaw, Annie's new boyfriend, with her and Jack having broken up due to her worry about Jack's dangerous lifestyle. Willem Dafoe starred as the villain John Geiger, and Glenn Plummer (who played Reeves's character's carjacking victim) also cameos as the same character, this time driving a boat that Alex takes control of. The film is considered one of the worst sequels of all time, scoring only 4% (based on 71 reviews) on Rotten Tomatoes.

Legacy
 MythBusters 2009 season tested the real-world viability of the film's bus jump scene.
 The film is parodied in the UK Channel 4 sitcom Father Ted, in the episode "Speed 3", where Father Dougal drives a booby-trapped milk float that will explode if its speed falls below 4 mph.
 In The Simpsons, the film was briefly cited by Homer Simpson in The Springfield Files as the inspiration for his idea to use old CCTV footage to allow him and his friends to go drinking, though believes it is called "The Bus That Couldn't Slow Down".
 A hidden mission in Grand Theft Auto features the player having to drive a bus at speed, with the vehicle exploding in the event that it slows down too much.
 Mission "Publicity Tour" from Grand Theft Auto: Vice City was inspired by the movie. Also, a character named Steve Scott was voiced by Dennis Hopper.
 A clip of Speed is seen in the 2020 live-action/CGI film Sonic the Hedgehog, which the title character considered one of his favorite action films.
 In the 2018 video game Spider-Man, Spider-Man can mention that a crime committed by the Demon Gang involving an armed bomb inside of a truck is similar to the plot of the film. In the voice line, he attempts to recall the name of the film, suggesting "Fastness" and "Super Quick."

See also
 The Doomsday Flight, a 1966 TV-movie in which a bomb will explode if a plane descends to land

References

External links

 
 
 

1994 films
1994 action thriller films
1994 directorial debut films
1990s American films
1990s chase films
1990s English-language films
1990s police procedural films
20th Century Fox films
20th Century Studios franchises
American action thriller films
American chase films
American films about revenge
American police detective films
BAFTA winners (films)
Fictional portrayals of the Los Angeles Police Department
Films about bomb disposal
Films about buses
Films about extortion
Films about murderers
Films about terrorism in the United States
Films directed by Jan de Bont
Films scored by Mark Mancina
Films set in 1994
Films set in Los Angeles
Films shot in California
Films that won the Best Sound Editing Academy Award
Films that won the Best Sound Mixing Academy Award
Films with screenplays by Joss Whedon